This is a list of all horse-drawn and electric tramcars of the Chesterfield Tramway, which opened on 8 November 1882, and closed on 23 December 1927.

Horse cars built between 1882 and 1903

Turner states that two tramcars were bought in 1903, which had previously been owned by Sheffield Tramway, and that they were probably never renumbered.

Electric cars built between 1904 and 1927

Several cars were damaged when a fire broke out at the depot on 20 October 1916. Car number 8 and one of the three cars bought in 1914 were scrapped because they were too damaged to be repaired. They were replaced by two additional trams obtained in 1920, although details of them are sketchy. Seven of the open topped vehicles were fitted with top covers in 1920.

Bibliography

References

Tramway
Chesterfield